Avidyā may refer to:
 Avidyā (Buddhism), a Buddhist concept which denotes ignorance of the four noble truths or misunderstanding of the nature of reality.
 Avidya (Hinduism), a Sanskrit word for ignorance or delusion in the finite self which appears in Hindu texts such as the Upanishads.